Canti may refer to:

 Canti (poetry collection), an 1835 collection of poems by Giacomo Leopardi
 Canti (surname)
 Canti Lau (born 1964), Hong Kong actor
 Canti, fictional robot from the Japanese animated series FLCL

See also
 Cantii or Cantiaci, Iron Age Celtic people living in Britain
 Canty (disambiguation)